David Klech (born April 29, 1988 in Walnut Creek, California) is an American decathlete. He attended the University of Oregon, after transferring from the University of California, Los Angeles.

Athletic career

Prep
One of the most dominant high school athletes of his time, Klech was a stand-out in nearly all track & field events.  Klech won a bronze medal in a tight finish in the 400 meter hurdles at the 2005 World Youth Championships in Athletics in Marrakesh.  That medal was advanced to silver when the winner, Abdulagadir Idriss, was disqualified for doping.  Klech was credited with the same time as eventual winner Mohammed Daak.

In 2006, his senior year, Klech represented California High School in San Ramon, California with a national high school leading 300 meter hurdles time of 35.45, set at the Arcadia Invitational, and a 400 meter hurdles time of 50.35 set at the Stanford Invitational.  He won the 300 hurdles at the CIF California State Meet, defeating both Jeshua Anderson and Reggie Wyatt, future national record holders.  He also long jumped .

For his record-setting senior year, David Klech was named the 2005-2006 Gatorade High School Track and Field Athlete of the Year.

University of California, Los Angeles
Klech ran with the UCLA Bruins during his freshman year, 2006-2007.  At UCLA, Klech was hampered by injuries. He only competed three times in outdoor track, and none of his marks were close to what he had achieved one year earlier in high school.  He was released by UCLA at the end of his freshman year, in June 2007.  He then transferred to University of Oregon and sat out (redshirted) the 2007-2008 season.

University of Oregon
At University of Oregon, Klech primarily competed in the 400 meter hurdles and high jump from 2009-2011.

As a fifth year senior, Klech began competing in the decathlon for the first time. Despite his inexperience, he finished 16th in the decathlon at the 2011 NCAA Men's Division I Outdoor Track & Field Championships and sixth in the heptathlon at the 2011 NCAA Men's Division I Indoor Track and Field Championships.  He was named a 2011 Indoor Track & Field All-American in the heptathlon and a 2011 Outdoor Track & Field All-American in the decathlon.

An excellent student, Klech was named a Track & Field All-Academic in 2009, 2010, and 2011.  He was also named to the 2011 Capital One Academic All-America Men's Track & Field/Cross Country first team. With a 3.96 GPA, Klech graduated magna cum laude with a bachelor's degree in psychology in 2011. He went on to earn a master's degree in psychology in 2011 and a second master's degree in educational leadership and administration in 2013, both from University of Oregon.

Professional
After graduating from Oregon, Klech placed second in the heptathlon in the 2012 USATF Indoor Combined Events Championships, with 5,809 points.  His performance included setting a meet-record time of 2:30.64 in the 1000 meters.

Coaching career
Klech is currently the Head Track & Field and Cross Country Coach at the University of California, Santa Cruz, where he focuses on sprints, hurdles, jumps, and multis for both men and women.

Kelch formerly spent three years coaching track & field at Acalanes High School in Pleasant Hill, California. Before that, Klech was a volunteer Assistant Track and Field Coach at University of Oregon, where he worked with the men and women on hurdles, multis, high jump, throws, and pole vault.

References

External links

David Klech profile on All-Athletics
Oregon Ducks bio
UCLA Bruins bio
 UCSC Banana Slugs bio 

1988 births
Living people
Sportspeople from Walnut Creek, California
American male hurdlers
American male decathletes
Oregon Ducks men's track and field athletes
Oregon Ducks track and field coaches
Track and field athletes from California
People from San Ramon, California
UC Santa Cruz Banana Slugs cross country coaches
Sports coaches from California
UCLA Bruins men's track and field athletes
UC Santa Cruz Banana Slugs track and field coaches